Dodurga is a town (belde) and municipality in the Bozüyük District, Bilecik Province, Turkey. Its population is 2,000 (2021). According to legend, the name of the town refers to one of the sons of Oghuz Khan, i.e., Ayhan. The settlement was declared a seat of the township in 1958.

References

Populated places in Bilecik Province
Towns in Turkey
Bozüyük District